Manx Financial Group (MFG) has subsidiaries engaged in financial services based in the Isle of Man and the UK. These companies offer financial services to both retail and commercial customers.

Principal wholly owned subsidiaries: Conister Bank Limited, Edgewater Associates Limited, Conister Card Services Limited, Manx Incahoot Limited and Manx FX Limited

Manx Financial Group PLC is a publicly traded company on the London Stock Exchange with a symbol of (LSE:MFX).

Conister Bank 

Conister Bank is an independent bank, named after Conister Rock in Douglas Bay. It was established in the Isle of Man in 1935 as Conister Trust and in 2009 changed its name to Conister Bank. Conister Bank offers both Personal and Commercial Banking, providing a wide variety of financial products and services, including taking deposits and the provision of credit facilities and asset finance.

Conister Bank is wholly owned by Manx Financial Group who has subsidiaries engaged in a suite of financial services based in the Isle of Man and the UK.

Conister Finance & Leasing  
Conister Finance & Leasing Ltd (Conister) is the wholesale lending and broker division of Conister Bank Limited (CBL). CBL is an independent bank based in the Isle of Man established in 1935. It is in itself a wholly owned subsidiary of Manx Financial Group PLC who are listed on the London Stock Exchange, AIM (RNS Number: 3730X) and owns a suite of financial services.

Conister lends to small and medium sized businesses (SMEs).

Edgewater Associates 
Edgewater Associates Limited is the largest independent Financial Advice firm in the Isle of Man and is regulated by the Financial Services Authority. It offers advice for personal and corporate clients in its specialist areas of wealth management, retirement planning, protection, lending services and general insurance.

Manx FX Limited

References 

Financial services companies of the Isle of Man
Financial services companies established in 1935
1935 establishments in the Isle of Man
Companies of the Isle of Man